Casanova was a German rock band formed by former members of the bands Mad Max, Bonfire, Warlock and the Rainbirds. The band included singer Michael Voss and Michael Eurich, of Warlock (band), and recorded the songs of Russ Ballard.

Discography
Studio Albums
Casanova (1991)
One Night Stand (1992)
Heroes (1999)
All Beauty Must Die (2004)

Extended Plays
Some Like It Different... Acoustic (1993)
Sway (1999)

Compilations
Ticket to the Moon (1997)

Unreleased Material
Secretly Yours (199X)

References

German musical groups